The Naff House is a historic house at the northwest corner of 3rd Avenue and Fir Street in Portland, Arkansas.  The Prairie Style brick house was built c. 1919, and is one of the few such houses in Ashley County.  It was designed and built by Russell and W.H. Gard, two brothers who built a number of other residences in Portland (although none were Prairie Style, and few survive).

The house was listed on the National Register of Historic Places in 1992.

See also 
National Register of Historic Places listings in Ashley County, Arkansas

References 

Houses on the National Register of Historic Places in Arkansas
Prairie School architecture in Arkansas
Houses completed in 1919
Houses in Ashley County, Arkansas
National Register of Historic Places in Ashley County, Arkansas
1919 establishments in Arkansas